Qumaq (ᖁᒪᖅ) is an Inuit given name and surname. While initially just a given name, it was recorded as a family name by the Canadian government, meaning that this last name is now inheritable from parent to child. Qumaq means intestinal worms or worms from lakes.

Examples
Taamusi Qumaq (1914-1993), politician and writer. Qumaq was initially a mononym that became eventually registered as a family name.
Qumaq Mangiuk Iyaituk (1954-), artist from Ivujivik.
The given name of a girl in the book Sanaaq.

See also
Disc number, the identification used for Inuit in the 20th century in lieu of surnames.

References 

Inuit

Inuktitut-language names
Inuktitut-language surnames